Sainte-Anne de Varennes Basilica is a Roman Catholic minor basilica dedicated to the Saint Anne located in Varennes, Quebec, Canada.  The basilica is under the circumscription of the Roman Catholic Diocese of Saint-Jean-Longueuil.  The basilica was decreed on June 18, 1993.

References

External links
 
 

Roman Catholic churches in Quebec
Churches completed in 1887
19th-century Roman Catholic church buildings in Canada
Churches in Montérégie
Varennes, Quebec
Basilica churches in Canada
Church buildings with domes